Sovetsky Sport (English: Soviet Sports) is a Russian (formerly Soviet) national daily sports newspaper. Until 19 March 1946 the newspaper was called Red Sports (Russian: Красный спорт), it was not printed between 1928 and 1932.

History 
Founded on July 20, 1924, in Moscow, it was the first sports newspaper of the USSR, an official organ of the USSR State Committee for Physical Culture and Sports and All-Union Central Council of Trade Unions. One of the major Soviet newspapers, in 1975 Soviet Sports was distributed in 104 countries and had a circulation of 3,900,000 (which increased to more than 5,000,000 in 1988). Having the nominal price of three kopeks, it was accessible to everyone in the country.

Soviet Sports provided daily coverage of major competitions in the USSR and abroad, of activities within national and international sports federations, published interviews with athletes, coaches and other sportspeople, and propagated a healthy lifestyle. It also organized traditional All-Union and international ice hockey, athletics, volleyball, swimming, skiing and other tournaments.  The newspaper was awarded Order of the Red Banner of Labour in 1974.

After the breakup of the USSR, newspaper's circulation declined to 122,900. One of the main reasons for this was the Sport-Express daily newspaper, which went to press in 1991, although its circulation is not as large too: about 650,000. Soviet Sports is currently published by the Russian Olympic Committee and Soviet Sports Publishing House. Since 2001 it has been printed in colour.

Notable journalists
 Yuri Vanyat (1913–1992) 
 Aron Itin (1st Editor of Red Sports; shot in 1938)
Semyon Belits-Geiman (born 1945)
 Vladimir Kuchmiy (1948–2009) 
Elena Vaytsekhovskaya (born 1958)
Vitaly Slavin (born 1960)
Vasily Utkin (born 1974)
 Alexey Andronov (born 1975)
 Sofya Tartakova (born 1989)

See also
Komsomolskaya Pravda

References

External links

 

Newspapers established in 1924
Sports newspapers
Newspapers published in the Soviet Union
Russian-language newspapers published in Russia
Sport in the Soviet Union
1924 establishments in the Soviet Union
Newspapers published in Moscow
Sports mass media in Russia